Kanti Singh (born 8 March 1957) is a former Central Minister and National President of RJD Women Cell. She was a member of the 14th Lok Sabha of India. She once represented the Arrah constituency of Bihar and is a national general secretary of Rashtriya Janata Dal (RJD) political party. She was earlier elected to 11th and 13th Lok Sabha from Bikramganj constituency.
She has held various portfolios in Central Government as Minister of Coal and Mines, Heavy Industries and Public Enterprises, Human Resources Development (HRD), Women Child and Development and Tourism and Culture.

Posts Held

External links
 Home Page on the Parliament of India's Website

References

1957 births
Living people
People from Arrah
Rashtriya Janata Dal politicians
India MPs 2004–2009
Union ministers of state of India
Lok Sabha members from Bihar
People from Rohtas District
Janata Dal politicians
India MPs 1996–1997
India MPs 1999–2004